Charles J. "Chuck" Cooper (born March 8, 1952, in Dayton, Ohio) is an appellate attorney and litigator in Washington, D.C., where he is a founding member and chairman of the law firm Cooper & Kirk, PLLC. He was named by The National Law Journal as one of the 10 best civil litigators in Washington. The New York Times described him as "one of Washington’s best-known lawyers." He has represented prominent American political figures, including Attorney General Jeff Sessions, in response to the alleged Russian interference in the 2016 United States elections; Attorney General John Ashcroft; and former National Security Adviser and United States Ambassador to the United Nations John Bolton.

Cooper has more than 25 years of legal experience in government and private practice, with numerous cases in trial and appellate court. He has argued several cases before the United States Supreme Court and been described as "one of the most prominent and aggressive Supreme Court litigators in the country."

Biography
Cooper was born on March 8, 1952, in Dayton, Ohio. He attended local schools and received his Bachelor of Arts in business in 1974 from the University of Alabama. He earned his J.D. degree in 1977 from the University of Alabama Law School. He was editor-in-chief of the Alabama Law Review and ranked first in his class.  He passed the bar in Alabama and Washington, D.C. He had two clerkships with judges. From 1977 to 1978, he clerked for Judge Paul Roney of the United States Court of Appeals for the Fifth Circuit, and from 1978 to 1979, he clerked for Justice William H. Rehnquist of the United States Supreme Court.

A member of the Republican Party, he started working in 1981 in the Civil Rights Division of the U.S. Department of Justice in Washington, D.C. In 1985, during the Reagan administration, he was appointed as an Assistant Attorney General in the Office of Legal Counsel, United States Department of Justice , the office responsible for providing legal opinions and informal advice to the White House, the Attorney General, and Executive Branch Departments and Agencies on issues of statutory, regulatory, constitutional and international law.

At a lunch at the Old Ebbitt Grill with other administration officials, he saw documents showing the administration's role in the Iran–Contra affair of 1986.

After his government service, in 1988 he entered private practice in the office of McGuire Woods. In 1990 he became a partner at Shaw Pittman (now Pillsbury Winthrop Shaw Pittman), where he headed the firm's Constitutional and Government Litigation Group. He worked there until co-founding Cooper & Carvin, now Cooper & Kirk, in 1996. His practice focuses on constitutional, commercial and civil rights litigation.

Cooper led the legal team for the defendant-intervenors in Hollingsworth v. Perry, defending California Proposition 8 in 2008, which banned same-sex marriage in the state.  He argued the case before the US Supreme Court. He has testified before Congress or Congressional committees on more than a dozen occasions.

He received the Republican National Lawyers Association's "Edwin Meese III Award" in 2016, and the group's "Republican Lawyer of the Year Award" in 2010.

Firm alumni 

Alumni of the firm Cooper founded include U.S. Senators such as Ted Cruz and Tom Cotton, Federal Judges such as Victor J. Wolski and Howard C. Nielson Jr., and a solicitor general Noel Francisco.

Cooper himself was touted as a possible Solicitor General nominee. During this process, a self-professed left leaning registered Democrat and Biglaw partner explained his reasons for supporting Cooper. He described Cooper as “thoroughly devoted to drawing principled constitutional lines,” “an immovable rock” for upholding the rule of law, and “one of the most principled lawyers you’ll ever encounter.”

Supreme Court arguments

Cooper has argued seven cases in front on the United States Supreme Court.

Virginia Uranium v. Warren

On Number 6, 2018, Cooper argued Virginia Uranium v. Warren.  In that case, Cooper represented the owner of a uranium mine arguing that Virginia's ban on uranium mining was preempted by federal law and was therefore unenforceable.

Hollingsworth v. Perry

On March 26, 2013, Cooper argued Hollingsworth v. Perry. The substantive question in that case was whether the Equal Protection Clause of the Fourteenth Amendment prohibits the state of California from defining marriage as the union of one man and one woman. Cooper represented the proponents of Proposition 8, a ballot initiative adopted by the voters of California that defined marriage as being between one man and one woman.

South Central Bell Telephone Company v. Alabama

On January 19, 1999, Cooper argued the case South Central Bell Telephone Company v. Alabama. In this case, the Supreme Court considered whether Alabama's franchise tax discriminates against interstate commerce, in violation of the Commerce Clause, and whether the Alabama Supreme Court's refusal to permit the South Central Bell Telephone Company and others to raise their constitutional claims because of res judicata deprives them of the due process of law guaranteed by the Fourteenth Amendment. Cooper argued the case on behalf of the State of Alabama.

Clinton v. City of New York

On April 27, 1998, Cooper argued the case Clinton v. City of New York. In that case, the Supreme Court considered whether the President's ability to selectively cancel individual portions of bills, under the Line Item Veto Act, violated the Presentment Clause of Article I. Cooper argued this case on behalf of the City of New York.

This case has been called “the blockbuster separation of powers case of the Rehnquist years.”

United States v. Winstar Corp.

On April 24, 1996, Cooper argued the case United States v. Winstar. In that case, the Supreme Court considered the question of whether the federal government can be sued by thrifts that were sent into financial trouble when Congress changed the computation of required reserves after the Federal Home Loan Bank Board encouraged actions based on the premise that the rules would not change.

This case has been described as “enormously important” and creating an “important precedent on the interpretation of Government contracts.”

Federal Election Commission v. NRA Political Victory Fund

On October 11, 1994, Cooper argued Federal Election Commission v. NRA Political Victory Fund This case raised various questions regarding whether portions of the Federal Election Campaign Act violated the Constitutionally mandated separation of powers. Cooper represented the NRA Political Victory Fund.

Lee v. Weisman

On November 6, 1991, Cooper argued the case Lee v. Weisman. The question in that case was whether the inclusion of clergy who offer prayers at official public school ceremonies violated the Establishment Clause of the First Amendment. This case is credited for introducing the “coercion test” that has subsequently gained greater prominence in Establishment Clause jurisprudence.

Publications 

Cooper has published many articles in law reviews and other scholarly publications.

 "Litigation: Time to Revisit Chevron Deference?" Mississippi Law Journal (2016)
 "Confronting the Administrative State," National Affairs (Fall 2015)
 "The Constitutional Legacy of William H. Rehnquist" (West Academic Publishing, 2015)
 "Reserved Powers of the States,” The Heritage Guide to the Constitution (Fully Revised Second Edition) (2014)
 "Complete Diversity and the Closing of the Federal Courts," Harvard Journal of Law & Public Policy (Winter 2014) (with Howard C. Nielson, Jr.)
 "Tribute to Judge Mark R. Kravitz," Lewis & Clark Law Review (2014)
 "An Attack on Separation of Powers and Federal Judicial Power? An Analysis of the Constitutionality of Section 18 of the America Invents Act," Engage: The Journal of the Federalist Society Practice Groups (July 30, 2012) (with Vincent Colatriano).
 "The Regulatory Authority of the Treasury Department to Index Capital Gains for Inflation: A Sequel," Harvard Journal of Law & Public Policy (Spring 2012) (with Vincent Colatriano).
 "The Constitution in One Sentence: Understanding the Tenth Amendment," First Principles Series (Published by the Heritage Foundation) (Jan. 10, 2011)
 "Federalism and the Telephone: The Case for Preemptive Federal Deregulation in the New World of Intermodal Competition," 6 Journal on Telecommunications & High Technology Law 293 (2008) (with Brian Stuart Koukoutchos).
 "Debate on Radicals in Robes," Originalism: A Quarter-Century of Debate (2007) (with Prof. Cass Sunstein)
 "The State of the Judiciary: A Corporate Perspective," 95 The Georgetown Law Journal 1107 (April 2007) (with Larry D. Thompson)
 "A Perjurer in the White House?: The Constitutional Case for Perjury and Obstruction of Justice as High Crimes and Misdemeanors," Harvard Journal of Law & Public Policy, (Spring 1999).
 "The Geography of Race in Elections: Color-Blindness and Redistricting," The Journal of Law and Politics (Winter 1998).
 "Term Limits for Judges?," 10 The Journal of Law and Politics, 669 (1997).
 "Race, Law and Justice: The Rehnquist Court and the American Dilemma,” The American University Law Review (Feb. 1996)
 "Constitutional Constraints on the Government," published in Litigating Against The Government: Leveling The Playing Field (National Legal Center for the Public Interest (1996)).
 "The Republican Congress and the Constitution in Foreign and Military Affairs," 2 Common Sense 75 (1995) (with Prof. John McGinnis).
 "The Federal Judiciary, Life Tenure, and Self-Government," 4 Cornell Journal of Law and Public Policy 500 (1995).
 "The Fifth Annual Robert C. Byrd Conference on the Administrative Process: The First Year of Clinton/Gore: Reinventing Government or Refining Reagan/Bush Initiatives?" The Administrative Law Journal of the American University (1994)
 "The Price of 'Political Independence': The Unconstitutional Status of the Legal Services Corporation," 4 Boston University Public Interest Law Journal 13 (1994) (with Michael A. Carvin).
 "Harry Jaffa’s Bad Originalism," 1994 Public Interest Law Review 189.
 "The Legal Authority of the Department of the Treasury to Promulgate a Regulation Providing for Indexation of Capital Gains," 12 Virginia Tax Review 631 (Spring 1993) (with Michael A. Carvin and Vincent J. Colatriano).
 “Independent of Heaven Itself: Differing Federalist and Anti-Federalist Perspectives on the Centralizing Tendency of the Federal Judiciary," 16 Harvard Journal of Law & Public Policy 119 (Winter 1993).
 "A Note on Justice Marshall and Stare Decisis," 1992 The Public Interest Law Review 95.
 "Wards Cove Packing Co. v. Atonio: A Step Toward Eliminating Quotas in the American Workplace," 14 Oklahoma City University Law Review 265 (Summer 1991).
 "Executive Power Over Foreign and Military Policy: Some Remarks on the Founders’ Perspective,” 16 Oklahoma City University Law Review 265 (Summer 1991).
 "How Separation of Powers Protects Individual Liberties," 41 Rutgers Law Review 789 (Spring 1989).
 "A Slow Return To Constitutional Colorblindness," 47 Legal Times 27 (May 1, 1989).
 "The Constitutionality of Drug Testing," Federal Bar News & Journal (October 1988).
 "Presidential Powers in the Area of Foreign Affairs," 43 University of Miami Law Review 165 (September 1988).
 "The Demise of Federalism," 20 The Urban Lawyer 239 (Spring 1988).
 "Stare Decisis: Precedent and Principle in Constitutional Adjudication," 73 Cornell Law Review 801 (January 1988).
 "The Line-Item Veto: The Framers' Intentions," published in Revitalizing the Presidential Veto (National Legal Center for the Public Interest (1988)).
 "Comment on Arthur Schlesinger's 'After the Imperial Presidency,'" 47 Maryland Law Review 84 (Fall 1988).
 "Raoul Berger, Constitutionalist," 4 Benchmark 183 (July–October 1987).
 "The Collateral Attack Doctrine and the Rules of Intervention: A Judicial Pincer Movement on Due Process," 1987 University of Chicago Legal Forum 155.
 "Limited Government and Individual Liberty: The Ninth Amendment's Forgotten Lesson," 4 Journal of Law & Politics 63 (University of Virginia) (Summer 1987).
 "Constitutional Adjudication and the Intentions of the Framers," 119 Federal Rules Decisions 553 (address before the judicial conference of the U.S. Court of Appeals for the District of Columbia Circuit, May 29, 1987).
 "Landmarks of Constitutional Interpretation," 40 Policy Review 10 (Spring 1987) (with Nelson Lund).
 "Application of Section 504 of the Rehabilitation Act of 1973 to persons with AIDS," published in Aids and the Law (Wiley Law Publications 1987).
 "Survey of Legal Issues Related to Acquired Immune Deficiency Syndrome (AIDS)," published in The Medical and Legal Implications of AIDS (Virginia Bar Association, 1987).
 "The First Amendment, Original Intent and The Political Process," 10 Harvard Journal of Law & Public Policy 15 (Winter 1987).
 "The Tenth Amendment Under Fire," 73 ABA Journal 42 (May 1987).
 "The Coercive Remedies Paradox," 9 Harvard Journal of Law and Public Policy 77 (Winter 1986).
 Book Review, 24 The Atlanta Lawyer 17 (April–May 1980) (reviewing B. Woodward and S. Armstrong, The Brethren).
 "The Attorney-Client Privilege in Alabama," 28 Alabama Law Review 641 (1977).

See also
 Timeline of investigations into Trump and Russia (2019)
 List of law clerks of the Supreme Court of the United States (Seat 9)

References

External links 
 Appearances at the U.S. Supreme Court from the Oyez Project
 Cooper & Kirk, PLLC

1952 births
20th-century American lawyers
21st-century American lawyers
Alabama lawyers
Federalist Society members
Law clerks of the Supreme Court of the United States
Lawyers from Birmingham, Alabama
Lawyers from Washington, D.C.
Living people
United States Assistant Attorneys General for the Office of Legal Counsel
University of Alabama School of Law alumni